In mathematics, Serre's modularity conjecture, introduced by , states that an odd, irreducible, two-dimensional Galois representation over a finite field arises from a modular form. A stronger version of this conjecture specifies the weight and level of the modular form. The conjecture in the level 1 case was proved by Chandrashekhar Khare in 2005, and a proof of the full conjecture was completed jointly by Khare and Jean-Pierre Wintenberger in 2008.

Formulation

The conjecture concerns the absolute Galois group  of the rational number field .

Additionally, assume  is odd, meaning the image of complex conjugation has determinant -1.

To any normalized modular eigenform

of level , weight , and some Nebentype character

,

a theorem due to Shimura, Deligne, and Serre-Deligne attaches to  a representation

This representation is characterized by the condition that for all prime numbers , coprime to  we have

and

Serre's conjecture asserts that for any representation  as above, there is a modular eigenform  such that

.

The level and weight of the conjectural form  are explicitly conjectured in Serre's article.  In addition, he derives a number of results from this conjecture, among them Fermat's Last Theorem and the now-proven Taniyama–Weil (or Taniyama–Shimura) conjecture, now known as the modularity theorem (although this implies Fermat's Last Theorem, Serre proves it directly from his conjecture).

Optimal level and weight

The strong form of Serre's conjecture describes the level and weight of the modular form.

The optimal level is the Artin conductor of the representation, with the power of  removed.

Proof
A proof of the level 1 and small weight cases of the conjecture was obtained in 2004 by Chandrashekhar Khare and Jean-Pierre Wintenberger, and by Luis Dieulefait, independently.

In 2005, Chandrashekhar Khare obtained a proof of the level 1 case of Serre conjecture, and in 2008 a proof of the full conjecture in collaboration with Jean-Pierre Wintenberger.

Notes

References

See also
 Wiles's proof of Fermat's Last Theorem

External links
Serre's Modularity Conjecture 50 minute lecture by Ken Ribet given on October 25, 2007 ( slides PDF, other version of slides PDF)
Lectures on Serre's conjectures

Modular forms
Theorems in number theory
Conjectures that have been proved